Vahid Najafi (born 16 February 1994) is an Iranian footballer who played as a forward for Mashhad in the Iran Pro League.

Club career statistics
Last Update: 31 July 2015

References

Sepahan S.C. footballers
1994 births
Living people
Iranian footballers
Association football forwards